Jacobo Torres Martínez (1898 in Vigo) was a Spanish footballer who played as a midfielder for Celta de Vigo.  He was part of the first-ever team fielded by Celta de Vigo in 1923.

Club career
Born in Vigo, he spent most of his career at his hometown club Fortuna de Vigo, playing for them until it was merged with Real Vigo Sporting in 1923, to form Celta de Vigo. Torres played in the last match that was held between these two rivals on 11 March 1923, which the fortunistas lost 0–1. The presentation match of Celta de Vigo was held at Coia on 16 September 1923, in a meeting between an A and a B team formed with the players from the club, taking advantage of the large team available that they had, and Torres was one of the 11 footballers that lined-up for the A team. On 10 April 1924, he played a friendly match for Celta against the Uruguay national team that would go on to win the 1924 Summer Olympics in Paris. He won two back-to-back Galician Championships with Celta in 1923–24 and 1924–25 before retiring at the end of that same season.

International career
Being a player of Fortuna de Vigo, he was summoned to play for the Galicia national team several times, and he was a member of the team that reached the final of the 1922–23 Prince of Asturias Cup, an inter-regional competition organized by the RFEF.

Honours

Club
Fortuna de Vigo
Galician Championship:
Winners (3) 1914–15, 1920–21 and 1921–22

Celta de Vigo
Galician Championship:
Winners (2) 1923–24 and 1924–25

International
Galicia
Prince of Asturias Cup:
Runner-up (1): 1922–23

References

1898 births
Date of death unknown
Footballers from Vigo
Spanish footballers
Association football midfielders
RC Celta de Vigo players